The National Anthem of Mongolia, known before 1991 as the state anthem of the Mongolian People's Republic, was created in 1950 with music composed by Bilegiin Damdinsüren and Luvsanjambyn Mördorj and lyrics written by Tsendiin Damdinsüren.

History
Since the early 20th century, Mongolia has had two national anthems: the first, used between 1924 and 1950, was called the "Mongol Internationale", with words by Sonombaljiryn Buyannemekh and music by Magsarjavyn Dugarjav. It is often incorrectly listed as the Mongolian-language version of "The Internationale", despite the two songs having almost nothing in common aside from similar names. "The Internationale" does have a Mongolian version, however, which should not be confused with the "Mongol Internationale".

The second anthem, by Damdinsüren and Mördorj, replaced the "Mongol Internationale" and has been in use since 1950. The lyrics were changed slightly in 1961 to include references to the Mongolian People's Revolutionary Party and remove references to various Soviet and Mongolian leaders; however, the original lyrics were restored in early 1991, a year prior to the end of the Mongolian People's Republic. Since 1991, most of the lyrics from 1950 are in use again, but the second verse (praising Lenin, Stalin, Sükhbaatar and Choibalsan) has been removed. On 6 July 2006, the lyrics were revised by the Mongolian Parliament to commemorate Genghis Khan.

The current constitution of Mongolia mandates that the national anthem be broadcast daily on media channels prior to the end of transmissions.

Lyrics

Current Version

1991—2006 Version

1961—1991 Version

1950—1961 Version

See also
 Flag of Mongolia
 Coat of arms of Mongolia
 Mongol Internationale
 Anthem of the Republic of Buryatia
 Anthem of the Republic of Kalmykia

Notes

References

External links

Audio 
 Audio of the national anthem of Mongolia 
 Audio of the national anthem of Mongolia, with information and lyrics (archive link)
 Instrumental version in RealAudio
Video
  – a TV station video of the anthem sung by four Mongolian celebrities
  – the video is redone with the new lyrics.
  – audio version of the 1950 anthem, with original lyrics praising Lenin, Stalin, Sukhbaatar and Choibalsan

Mongolia
National symbols of Mongolia
Mongolian music
1950 songs
National anthem compositions in A-flat major